Carterus is a genus of beetles in the family Carabidae, containing the following species:

 Carterus angustipennis (Chaudoir, 1852)
 Carterus angustus (Menetries, 1832)
 Carterus boschi Schauberger, 1934
 Carterus cribratus (Reiche & Saulcy, 1855)
 Carterus dama (P.Rossi, 1792)
 Carterus depressus (Brulle, 1832)
 Carterus fulvipes (Latreille, 1817)
 Carterus gilvipes (Piochard De La Brulerie, 1873)
 Carterus gracilis Rambur, 1837
 Carterus interceptus Dejean, 1830
 Carterus lefebvrei (Brulle, 1832)
 Carterus microcephalus Rambur, 1837
 Carterus neglectus Wrase, 1994
 Carterus rotundicollis Rambur, 1837
 Carterus rufipes (Chaudoir, 1843)
 Carterus validiusculus Brulerie, 1873

References

Harpalinae